is a passenger railway station in located in the city of Kōka,  Shiga Prefecture, Japan, operated by the private railway operator Ohmi Railway.

Lines
Minakuchi Ishibashi Station is served by the Ohmi Railway Main Line, and is located 44.4 rail kilometers from the terminus of the line at Maibara Station.

Station layout
The station consists of one side platform serving a single bi-directional track. The station is unattended.

Platforms

Adjacent stations

History
Minakuchi Ishibashi Station was opened on August 16, 1957

Passenger statistics
In fiscal 2018, the station was used by an average of 60 passengers daily.

Surroundings
 Minakuchi-juku
 Shiga Prefecture Mizuguchi General Government Building
 Public Koka Hospital-The nearest station is Minakuchi Station next door
 Mizuguchi Child Care Support Center
Shiga Central Forestry Association Headquarters

See also
List of railway stations in Japan

References

External links

 Ohmi Railway official site 

Railway stations in Shiga Prefecture
Railway stations in Japan opened in 1957
Kōka, Shiga